The 1999 Big League World Series took place from August 8–14 in Tucson, Arizona, United States. Orlando, Florida defeated Fraser Valley, Canada in the championship game.

This was the first BLWS held in Tucson; it also featured the debut of round-robin pool play.

Teams

Results

United States Pool

International Pool

Elimination Round

References

Big League World Series
Big League World Series